Don Greenwood may refer to:
Don Greenwood (game designer), board game designer
Don Greenwood Jr. (1928–1990), American set decorator
Don Greenwood (American football) (1921–1983), American football player
Donald D. Greenwood of Greenwood function